Mohammad Khan Majeedi  was born on 5 January 1918 at village Shadman Jatoi, Taluka Mirpur Bathoro, Sujawal District. He was a nationalist poet in the Sindhi language. He died on 7 April 2003 in Sujawal.

Education
His early education was at Jhok, and passed Sindhi final with first position from Sindh Madarsa, Karachi in 1932.

Professional career
Mohammad Khan Majeedi was appointed as a Dhuk Munshi at Jhok, then, Primary teacher in August 1934. Serving at various schools as a teacher he finally retired from the post of Headmaster on 5 January 1976.

Political background
During his service he attended many gatherings, educational programs and endeavored for the rights of teachers from the platform of All Sindh Primary Teachers Association. He was inspired from G. M. Syed, pioneer of Modern Sindhi nationalism. He wrote several pieces of poetry on Sindh land.

Literary career
After retirement Majeedi had dedicated his time for poetry, he reads his poetry on stage with melodious tune. He started poetry during his service.

Publications
His first book Sindhri Ain Una Joon Qomoon, a long poem of 96 stanzas about tribes and casts of Sindh, each stanza consisted of 8 lines, published in 1992. His another book of poetry Mitti Muhinji Mitti Aa published in 2000. His poetry has been sung by Zarina Baloch, Sarmad Sindhi and other artist. He had received several awards. He has two daughters and a son, the second daughter Maryam Majeedi is also a poet.

Recognition
Government of Sindh had recognized his services and dedication towards the Sindh and its people, and had named a girls school after his name as "Government Girls Primary School MUHAMMAD KHAN MAJIDI, PO JHOKE SHARIF, Mirpur Bithoro.

Death
He died on 7 April 2003 in Sujawal.

References

Pakistani poets
Sindhi-language poets
Sindhi people
1918 births
2003 deaths
People from Sujawal District